Fiji's Court of Appeal is chaired by the President of the Court of Appeal.  The Chief Justice of Fiji is not permitted to hold this position; in order to give the Court of Appeal a degree of independence from the High Court and the Supreme Court, the Chief Justice, who chairs both courts, is constitutionally disqualified from presiding over, or even sitting on, the Court of Appeal.

The following persons have served as President of the Court of Appeal since it was established in 1999.

See also
 Constitution of Fiji: Chapter 9 (detailing the composition and role of the judiciary)

References

Judiciary of Fiji